Olivaichthys viedmensis, the Otuno, is a species of velvet catfish endemic to Argentina where it is found in the Rio Negro and tributaries.  It reaches a length of  SL.

References 
 

Olivaichthys
Fish of South America
Freshwater fish of Argentina
Endemic fauna of Argentina
Fish described in 1931